Major-General Sir Cornelius Francis Clery  (13 February 1838 – 25 June 1926) was a British Army officer who took part in the Anglo-Zulu War and later commanded the 2nd Division during the Second Boer War.

Early life
Cornelius Frances Clery was born in 2 Sidney Place, Cork, Ireland on 13 February 1838. He was educated at Clongowes Wood College in County Kildare.

Military career
Clery was commissioned as an ensign into the 32nd Regiment of Foot in 1858. He was promoted to lieutenant in 1859 and captain in 1866. He became an instructor at the Royal Military College, Sandhurst, in 1872, and later became Professor of Tactics. He became Deputy Assistant Adjutant & Quartermaster-General in Ireland in 1875, the same year his book, Minor Tactics was published.  The book would be highly influential for at least thirty years. In 1877, he was Deputy Assistant Adjutant & Quartermaster-General at Aldershot.

South Africa
In 1878 Clery, now a major, was sent to South Africa as a special staff officer where he served in two brief expeditions in Griqualand West and Sekhukhuneland. He later took part in the Anglo-Zulu War as the principal staff officer to Colonel Richard Glyn, the man responsible for the centre column of the invasion force.  Clery was given the job of marking out a camp near the Isandlwana hill on 20 January 1879.  Then, in the early hours of 22 January, he accompanied Glyn, Lord Chelmsford and half of the column as they were drawn away by a decoy element whilst the camp was massacred during the Battle of Isandlwana. He was later transferred to Sir Evelyn Wood's column where he took part in the Battle of Ulundi on 4 July 1879.

North Africa
In 1882 Clery served as assistant adjutant and quartermaster general in the Egyptian Campaign. He was appointed chief of the staff to the Suakin Expedition of 1884, deputy adjutant-general to the Nile Expedition to relieve Major-General Gordon in 1884 and chief of the staff to the Egyptian Army of Occupation in 1886.

Second Boer War
After a stint back in Britain, first as commandant of the Staff College, Camberley in 1888, and then, following a promotion to major-general, as commander of an infantry brigade at Aldershot in 1894, Clery was appointed as general officer commanding, 2nd Division in 1899. He was appointed Knight Commander of the Order of the Bath (KCB) in the 1899 Birthday Honours. He led the division during the Second Boer War. For his services during the campaign, he was appointed a Knight Commander of the Order of St Michael and St George.

Later life
Clery retired from the British Army due to ill health in 1901. He was very eccentric and had a habit of dyeing his prominent side-whiskers blue. In his retirement, he wrote a manual on military tactics.  He died on 25 June 1926 at 4 Whitehall Court, Westminster, London.

Publications

Notes

References

  

1838 births
1926 deaths
Military personnel from County Cork
British Army major generals
Knights Commander of the Order of the Bath
Knights Commander of the Order of St Michael and St George
People educated at Clongowes Wood College
32nd Regiment of Foot officers
Academics of the Royal Military College, Sandhurst
Commandants of the Staff College, Camberley
British Army personnel of the Anglo-Zulu War
British Army personnel of the Anglo-Egyptian War
British Army personnel of the Mahdist War
British Army personnel of the Second Boer War
People from Cork (city)